Hillside, also known as Little Elmington, is a 1½ story brick house near Charles Town, West Virginia dating to circa 1798–1800.  The house possesses a striking two-story gallery supported by five large round columns. The property includes a rubblestone barn and spring house. The house's name refers to its construction into the natural hillside in a manner similar to that of a bank barn, with the principal entry on the upper, uphill level.

References

Houses on the National Register of Historic Places in West Virginia
Houses in Jefferson County, West Virginia
Federal architecture in West Virginia
Georgian architecture in West Virginia
National Register of Historic Places in Jefferson County, West Virginia
Farms on the National Register of Historic Places in West Virginia
Houses completed in 1800